Delmán Useche (born 21 June 1950) is a Venezuelan footballer. He played in six matches for the Venezuela national football team from 1969 to 1975. He was also part of Venezuela's squad for the 1975 Copa América tournament.

References

1950 births
Living people
Venezuelan footballers
Venezuela international footballers
Place of birth missing (living people)
Association football midfielders
Deportivo Italia players
Carabobo F.C. players